Andrew Sambu (born 5 October 1972) is a Tanzanian long-distance runner. He competed in the men's 5000 metres at the 1992 Summer Olympics.

References

1972 births
Living people
Athletes (track and field) at the 1992 Summer Olympics
Tanzanian male long-distance runners
Olympic athletes of Tanzania
Place of birth missing (living people)